Osmida was a town and a district of ancient Crete. Its site is not located exactly, but it has been suggested to be near Monopari.

References

Populated places in ancient Crete
Former populated places in Greece
Lost ancient cities and towns